The City Line (sometimes City Lines) is the brand name used by Merseytravel on suburban rail services in the Liverpool City Region (Merseyside and Halton) starting eastwards from the mainline platforms of Liverpool Lime Street railway station.

The term covers most of the Liverpool City Region sections of the Crewe–Liverpool line, the two Liverpool–Manchester lines and the Liverpool–Wigan line, with services continuing to Warrington, Chester via Runcorn and Blackpool and Preston via Wigan.

It is mainly operated by Northern Trains, with additional long-distance services operated by TransPennine Express, Avanti West Coast, East Midlands Railway, Transport for Wales and West Midlands Trains. Unlike the other two Merseytravel-supervised lines, the Merseyrail Northern and Wirral lines, the City Line is not operated by Merseyrail, however most of the line's stations within the Liverpool City Region are in Merseytravel's Merseyrail branding. The line is usually depicted on Merseytravel signage and maps using the colour red.

History

The City Line can trace its origins back to the dawn of the railway era, as it incorporates most of the route of the Liverpool and Manchester Railway, opened in 1830 and including Broad Green Station, the oldest operating station in the world.  Other early railway companies whose lines are now part of the City Line include the Cheshire Lines Committee and the London and North Western Railway.

These disparate local railway services were not marketed under a common name until 1972, when Merseyside PTE introduced the Merseyrail brand for services which were operated by British Rail on its behalf. The PTE applied the City Line name to local services out of Liverpool's main station at Lime Street.

Around this time, ambitious plans were floated to electrify parts of the City Line and incorporate it into the Northern line, via the Wapping Tunnel from Edge Hill to Liverpool Central. However, after work started, they were abandoned, and to this day the suburbs of eastern Liverpool have no direct route to other suburbs of the city without changing to the underground network at Lime Street.

In the 1990s, as part of the Government's rail privatisation, the City Line services became part of the North Western Trains franchise (later taken over by FirstGroup and renamed First North Western).

In 2004, the First North Western franchise was merged with that of neighbouring train company Arriva Trains Northern to create a new franchise covering the north of England. The new franchise was won by Northern Rail, owned by the Serco-Abellio consortium (who, coincidentally, had been named as the operators of the Merseyrail Electrics franchise a year earlier).

Description

The City Line comprises routes are shared with local and inter-city express services. The lines which make up the City Line are:

 Liverpool–Wigan line (and onward to Preston via the West Coast Main Line)
 Liverpool–Manchester lines (Middle and Southern Routes, including the branch to Warrington Bank Quay)
 Crewe–Liverpool line (and onward to Birmingham New Street via the West Coast Main Line)

Services

Services on the City Line are provided by Northern, Transpennine Express, Avanti West Coast, East Midlands Railway, Transport for Wales, and West Midlands Trains.

Monday to Saturday daytimes, most stations are served by a train every half-hour on core sections of route. Some smaller stations are served only by one train per hour. Services are less frequent in the evenings.

Timetables are produced by Merseytravel. Typical off-peak weekday service is as follows:

Branding 

Merseytravel's local rail network map shows how the Liverpool City Region and its immediate neighbours are served by the various local rail services. It displays the Merseyrail Northern and Wirral Lines alongside the City Line, with contact details for Merseyrail, plus Northern Trains and all of the individual operators who provide services on the City Line.
Due to the division between local transport operator Merseytravel and regional franchise operator Northern Trains, the City Line is inconsistently branded. Timetables published by Merseytravel displayed at stations use the City Line branding referring to several operators, whilst Northern Trains (and other operators using parts of the same routes) do not refer to the line in their own publicity or onboard trains. Additionally, main line stations operated by Merseytravel carry Merseyrail branding, despite being separate from the electric rapid transit/commuter network and being absent from some official Merseyrail maps.

Trains

There were 17 Class 142 diesel powered Pacer units painted in the PTE's yellow livery, ostensibly for use on City Line services. However, they are not dedicated to Merseyside operations and can often be seen working on other Northern Rail services outside the Merseyside area. Conversely, Class 142s in other liveries could previously be frequently seen working Lime Street City Line services.

Some longer-distance City Line services are diagrammed for Class 150 or Class 156 Sprinter units.

On 28 February 2007 Merseytravel announced a new deal with Northern Rail and Angel Trains, which would see four Pacers taken out of service and replaced by six Class 156 units. The higher capacity of the 156s will assist in tackling overcrowding. This new arrangement is expected to begin with the May 2007 timetable.

Future

Electrification of the City Line

Formerly the only section of City Line route electrified was between Lime Street and Liverpool South Parkway, which is used by Virgin and London Midland Electric Multiple Units. The line from Liverpool to Manchester via Newton-le-Willows was electrified, along with the Liverpool–Wigan line, opening in early 2015.

Four electrified tracks are operative from Broad Green Station to Huyton Station. This is to allow a fast uninterrupted service from Liverpool to Manchester and slower electric urban trains to operate on segregated tracks from Liverpool to Wigan.  Merseyrail City Line trains run on this section of track. Northern Trains operate the trains on this electrified section of tracks.

Bootle branch line
The Canada Dock Branch line, also known as the Bootle branch line, is a line running from Edge Hill Junction in the east of the city in a long curve to Canada Dock in the north of the city. The line's last remaining passenger services were withdrawn in 1977, however the line remains busy with freight to Seaforth Dock and its container terminal and Liverpool2 container terminal.

The line from Edge Lane would continue through to Edge Hill station and terminate at Lime Street.

Network Rail have investigated options for the Canada Dock Branch in their Route Utilisation Strategy for Merseyside and have concluded that the expected benefits do not justify the investment in new infrastructure. It had been suggested that Liverpool F.C. could assist in funding the reopening of this line to provide a direct link to their proposed extension of the Anfield stadium.

The Department for Transport's Rail electrification document of July 2009, states that the route to Liverpool Docks will be electrified.  The Canada Dock Branch Line is the only line into the docks.  From the document:

70. Electrification of this route will offer electric haulage options for freight.
There will be an alternative route to Liverpool docks for electrically-operated freight trains, and better opportunities of electrified access to the proposed freight terminal at Parkside near Newton-le-Willows.

The electrification of this line would greatly assist in recommissioning passenger trains, as costs would be reduced.

References

External links

 Merseytravel

Rail transport in Liverpool
Railway lines in North West England
Rail transport in Merseyside